Immola Airfield  is an airfield in Imatra, Finland, about  northeast of Imatrankoski, the centre of Imatra.

History

Planning of the airfield began in 1933, and the airfield was opened in 1936. Before and during the Second World War, the airfield served as a base of the Finnish Air Force. The German leader (Führer) Adolf Hitler visited Immola on June 4, 1942 to congratulate C. G. E. Mannerheim, the Marshal of Finland, on his 75th birthday. In the summer of 1944, the Detachment Kuhlmey operated mainly from Immola.

See also
List of airports in Finland

References

External links

 VFR Suomi/Finland – Immola Airfield
 Lentopaikat.net – Immola Airfield 

Airports in Finland
Airfield
Buildings and structures in South Karelia